IC 348 is a star-forming region in the constellation Perseus located about 315 parsecs from the Sun. It consists of nebulosity and an associated 2-million-year-old cluster of roughly 400 stars within an angular diameter of 20. The most massive stars in the cluster are the binary star system BD+31°643, which has a combined spectral class of B5. Based upon infrared observations using the Spitzer Space Telescope, about half of the stars in the cluster have a circumstellar disk, of which 60% are thick or primordial disks. 

The age of this cluster has allowed three low mass brown dwarfs to be discovered. These objects lose heat as they age, so they are more readily discovered while they are still young.

References

Open clusters
0348
Star-forming regions
Perseus (constellation)